Piranha NYC  is a motion graphics, design, and VFX house founded in 2009 by  Gaspard Giroud and Rob Sabatini in SoHo, New York City. Piranha's clients include Intel, Verizon, Coca-Cola, Nike, Reebok, L'oreal, IBM, Delta Air Lines, Mercedes, Trojan, Lucky, Sony Ericsson, Wired, UPS, KMart, HBO.

3D World Magazine listed Piranha as one of the ten hottest CG studios of 2012, in part of their visualization of the New World Trade Center, that was featured in several architectural publications. The company was twice nominated for New York Emmy Awards in category of graphics.

Piranha NYC also worked on 3D modelling for the Sex and the City movie. The company partnered with Fluid in 2009 to provide 3D and visual work.

At the beginning of 2012 Piranha participated in the CGarchitect 3D awards competition with their film created for Silverstein Properties. It has been selected as one of the five nominees in the category of Architectural Film/Animation (Commissioned).

The company created the visual accompaniment of Rihanna to play behind Coldplay while performing their single "Princess of China" on 2012 tour.

In September 2012 3D World Magazine named Piranha to Arch-Viz Animation winner in the 2012 CG Awards.

References 

 Gaspard Giroud. New WTC 2013
 Home Builder Developer
 The New York Times movies
 World News

External links

2009 establishments in New York City
Mass media companies established in 2009
Computer animation
Mass media companies based in New York City
Television and film post-production companies
Visual effects companies